Jefisley André Caldeira (born May 16, 1980) is a Brazilian midfielder who plays for Hapoel Ramat Gan. Some of his other former teams include Goiás, Beitar Jerusalem, Maccabi Petah Tikva and Hapoel Be'er Sheva.
In September 2011, he signed at Hapoel Petah Tikva.

External links
 Jefisley André Caldeira at BDFA.com.ar 

1980 births
Living people
Brazilian footballers
Brazilian expatriate footballers
Goiás Esporte Clube players
Beitar Jerusalem F.C. players
Maccabi Petah Tikva F.C. players
Hapoel Be'er Sheva F.C. players
AEP Paphos FC players
AEL Limassol players
Hapoel Ramat Gan F.C. players
Hapoel Petah Tikva F.C. players
Expatriate footballers in Israel
Expatriate footballers in Cyprus
Israeli Premier League players
Liga Leumit players
Cypriot First Division players
Association football midfielders